"Brindemos" is a song by Puerto Rican rapper Anuel AA featuring Puerto Rican singer Ozuna, released in July 2018. This is the first single that Anuel AA released after coming out of prison.

Music video
The video of "Brindemos" was released in August with the song in Anuel AA's YouTube channel. As of April 2019, the music video overall has over 170 million views on YouTube. This is the first video that Anuel AA releases after being release from prison.

Charts

Weekly charts

Year-end charts

Certifications

References

2018 singles
2018 songs
Anuel AA songs
Ozuna (singer) songs
Spanish-language songs
Songs written by Anuel AA
Songs written by Ozuna (singer)